Antti Ropponen (born 17 August 1995) is a Finnish volleyball player for Hurrikaani Loimaa and the Finnish national team.

He participated at the 2017 Men's European Volleyball Championship.

References

1995 births
Living people
Finnish men's volleyball players